Adriano Buergo (born José Adriano Buergo y Ortiz March 5, 1964), is a Cuban artist specializing in painting, drawing and installations.

Buergo was a member of two in Havana, Cuba based artistic groups: Grupo Vindicación, from 1983–84; and Grupo Puré, from 1986–1987.

Buergo studied painting in at the Escuela Nacional de Bellas Artes "San Alejandro" between 1980 and 1983 and continued his studies until he graduated from the Instituto Superior de Arte (ISA) in 1988. He was a professor at the Instituto Superior Pedagógico "Enrique José Varona," in Havana, Cuba, from 1988-1990.

Individual Exhibitions

 1986 – "Del Ambiente", Wifredo Lam Center, Havana, Cuba.
 1989 – "Roto Expone. Adriano Buergo", Castillo de la Real Fuerza, Havana, Cuba.
 1990 – "Solo Show", Provincial Center of Culture, Pinar del Río, Cuba.
 1991 – "Ana Albertina & Adriano", Nina Menocal Gallery, Mexico City, Mexico.

Collectives Exhibitions

 1986 – "Puré Expone", Galería L, Havana, Cuba.
 1986 – "10 Años del I.S.A.", Museo Nacional de Bellas Artes de La Habana, Havana, Cuba
 1986 – "XVI Seminario Juvenil de Estudios Martianos", I.S.A., Havana, Cuba
 1986 – "Salón Nacional de Artes Plásticas de Escuelas de Arte (nivel medio)", Museo Nacional de Bellas Artes de La Habana, Havana, Cuba.
 1988 – "Venes Artistas Cubanos", Massachusetts College of Arts, Boston, Massachusetts
 1988 – Raíces en acción, Museo de Arte Carrillo Gil, Mexico City, Mexico
 1988 – Arte cubano, Galeria Tetriakov, Moscow, Russia
 1988 – Veintitantos abriles, Galeria Habana, Havana, Cuba
 1988 – Estrictamente personal, Fototeca de Cuba, Havana, Cuba
 1988 – Aire fresco, Galería Plaza Vieja, Grupo Puré, Havana, Cuba
 1988 – Expo Puré, Parallel Exhibition to Havana's III Biennial of Art. Instituto Superior de Arte, Havana, Cuba
 1988 – Primer encuentro de jóvenes artistas, Museo Provincial de Villa Clara, Cuba
 1989 – Tradición y contemporaneidad, III Bienal de La Habana, Museo Nacional de Bellas Artes, Havana, Cuba
 1989 – Kitsch, Galería de Galeano, Parallel Exhibition to Havana's III Biennial of Art. Havana, Cuba
 1989 – Tributo, Galeria Habana del Este, Parallel Exhibition to Havana's III Biennial of Art. Havana, Cuba
 1989 – Sexo y erotismo, Universidad de La Habana, Parallel Exhibition to Havana's III Biennial of Art. Havana, Cuba
 1989 – Paisaje, Comité Estatal de Finanzas, Parallel Exhibition to Havana's III Biennial of Art. Havana, Cuba
 1989 – Salón Nacional de Pequeño Formato, Centro de Arte Camagüey, Cuba
 1989 – Es solo lo que ves (Arte abstracto) Havana, Cuba
 1989 – La Habana en Madrid, Centro Cultural de la Villa, Madrid, Spain
 1990 – Kuba OK", Kunsthalle Düsseldorf, Düsseldorf, Germany
 1990 – No man is an island, Pori Art Museum, Finland, and Mücsarnok, Budapest, Hungary, and also Palffy Palace, Vienna, Austria.
 1990 – Salón Nacional de Pequeño Formato, Camagüey–Las Tunas, Cuba
 1990 – El objeto esculturado, Centro de Desarrollo de las Artes Visuales, Havana, Cuba
 1991 – Artistas Cubanos, Ninart, Centro de Cultura, Mexico City, Mexico
 1991 – Los Cubanos Llegaron Ya II, Ninart, Centro de Cultura, Mexico City, Mexico.
 1991 – La Naturaleza Simbolizada, La Unidad de Promoción Cultural y Acervo Patrimonial de la S.H.C.P., Mexico City, Mexico.
 1991 – Los hijos de Guillermo Tell. Artistas cubanos contemporáneos, Museo de Artes Visuales Alejandro Otero, Caracas, Venezuela y Banco de la Republica de Colombia, Bogotá, Colombia.
 1991 – Nuevas adquisiciones contemporáneas: muestras de arte cubano, Museo Nacional de Bellas Artes, Havana, Cuba
 1991 – Cuba construye (Arte Joven Cubano), Euskal Fondoa \Bilbao, Bilbao, Spain
 1992 – Los Cubanos Llegaron Ya III, Ninart, Centro de Cultura, Mexico City, Mexico
 1992 – La Década Prodigiosa: Plástica Cubana de los 80, Museo Universitario del Chopo, Mexico City, Mexico
 1992 – I Bienal del Caribe y Centroamérica, Galería de Arte Moderno, República Dominicana
 1992 – Expo-Arte Guadalajara 92, Guadalajara, Mexico City, Mexico
 1993 – Muro Roto/Broken Wall, Fred Snitzer Gallery, Miami, Florida
 1997 – Breaking Barriers: Selections from the Museum of Contemporary Cuban Art Collection, Museum of Art, Fort Lauderdale, Florida
 2000 – Palmas Reales y Vitrales, José Alonso Fine Arts Gallery, Miami, Florida
 2001 – Entre Cubanos. Artemira Gallery, Dominican Republic
 2001 – CAFE. Augusta Savage Gallery, Amherst, Massachusetts
 2002 – CAFE II: The journeys of Cuban Artists. University of Colorado Colorado Springs

Awards

 1983 – First Place – Salón Nacional de Artes Plásticas de Escuelas de Arte (nivel medio), Museo Nacional de Bellas Artes de La Habana, Havana, Cuba
 1986 – Award – XVI Seminario Juvenil de Estudios Martianos, Instituto Superior de Arte (I.S.A), Havana, Cuba
 1987 – Grand Prize – Salón Playa’87,  Servando Cabrera Moreno Gallery, Havana, Cuba
 1988 – Honorable Mention – Salón de la Ciudad, Centro Provincial de Artes Plásticas y Diseño, Havana, Cuba

Collections

His work can be found in the permanent collections of:
 Museo Cubano de Arte y Cultura, Miami, Florida
 Museo Nacional de Bellas Artes de La Habana, Havana, Cuba
 The Lowe Art Museum, University of Miami, Coral Gables, Florida
 Museum of Arts, Fort Lauderdale, Florida
 Galería Nina Menocal, Centro de Cultura, Mexico City, Mexico
 Ludwig Forum für Internationale Kunst, Aachen, Germany
Kendall Art Center, Miami, Florida

References
  Jose Veigas-Zamora, Cristina Vives Gutierrez, Adolfo V. Nodal, Valia Garzon, Dannys Montes de Oca; Memoria: Cuban Art of the 20th Century; (California/International Arts Foundation 2001); 
 Jose Viegas; Memoria: Artes Visuales Cubanas Del Siglo Xx; (California International Arts 2004);   
  Ales Erjavec, Editor;Postmodernism and the Postsocialist Condition: Politicized Art under Late Socialism; (University of California Press; 2003);

External links

 Cuba Encuentro article 
 https://web.archive.org/web/20080226193206/http://www.cuba-avantgarde.com/acquisitions.php
Kendall Art Center catalogue

Living people
1964 births
Artists from Havana
Cuban painters
Modern painters
Cuban contemporary artists
Instituto Superior de Arte alumni